Petojo Utara is an administrative village in the Gambir district of Indonesia. It has a postal code of 10130.

See also
 List of administrative villages of Jakarta

Administrative villages in Jakarta
Gambir, Jakarta